Wu Wei (Pinyin: Wú Wěi;  born 10 March 1983 in Tianjin) is a Chinese former football player who played as a defender and currently coach of China League One club Zhejiang Greentown.

Club career
Wu started his professional career with Chinese Jia-B League side Zhejiang Greentown in 2002. He made an impression within the team in the early years as Zhejiang Greentown won promotion to the first tier at the end of the 2006 season. 

He joined Scottish side Forfar Athletic in 2009 forming a partnership with Charlie Adameno known as "The Dream Ticket". He shared a flat with fellow Chinese player Tan Yang at this time.

He was a substitute player when Zhejiang Greentown played in the Chinese Super League and was released in January 2012 after Takeshi Okada became the head coach of the club.

Wu joined Guizhou Renhe in February 2012. He made 6 appearances for Guizhou in the 2012 league season, all coming on as substitute.

In January 2014, Wu returned to Hangzhou Greentown after Okada left the club.

Honours
Guizhou Renhe
 Chinese FA Cup: 2013

References

Living people
1983 births
Chinese footballers
Footballers from Tianjin
Zhejiang Professional F.C. players
Beijing Renhe F.C. players
Chinese Super League players
China League One players
Association football defenders
Ningbo University alumni